Juhani Arajärvi  (25 July 1867, Urjala – 13 November 1941) was a Finnish politician. He was a member of the Senate of Finland. Arajärvi was Minister of Finance from 1917 to 1918.

1867 births
1941 deaths
People from Urjala
People from Häme Province (Grand Duchy of Finland)
Finnish Party politicians
National Coalition Party politicians
Finnish senators
Ministers of Finance of Finland
Members of the Diet of Finland
Members of the Parliament of Finland (1907–08)
Members of the Parliament of Finland (1908–09)
Members of the Parliament of Finland (1909–10)
Members of the Parliament of Finland (1910–11)
Members of the Parliament of Finland (1911–13)
Members of the Parliament of Finland (1916–17)
Members of the Parliament of Finland (1917–19)
Members of the Parliament of Finland (1919–22)
People of the Finnish Civil War (White side)
Finnish bankers

References